Whitefield railway station (station code: WFD) is an Indian Railways train station located in Whitefield, Bangalore, in the Indian state of Karnataka, which is about 8 km away from the Krishnarajapuram railway station and serves the Whitefield area.

The Whitefield railway station is about 3 km north of the Whitefield Bus stop. It lies on the Bangalore–Chennai route and is double and electrified, the Krishnarajapuram–Whitefield section is slated to be converted to a quadruple line. The station is slated to become a junction with a new Whitefield–Kolar (53 km; 33 miles) line being laid.

Structure 
Whitefield railway station has four platforms, each running to 650m in length, shelters, lighting, benches and a booking office.

Line
Whitefield railway station is on the Bangalore–Chennai main line. The railway station is located between Hoodi Halt railway station and Devangonthi railway station.

Originating/terminating trains

See also 
 List of railway stations in India

References

External links

Railway stations in Bangalore
Bangalore railway division
Transport in Bangalore